Brzeźnica  is a village in Żagań County, Lubusz Voivodeship, in western Poland. It is the seat of the gmina (administrative district) called Gmina Brzeźnica.

The village has a population of 875.

References

External links
 Archived official website

Villages in Żagań County